Yann del Pino Rolim (born 15 March 1995) is a Brazilian professional footballer who plays as a midfielder for Tombense.

References

External links 

1995 births
Living people
Brazilian footballers
Association football midfielders
Campeonato Brasileiro Série A players
Campeonato Brasileiro Série B players
Campeonato Brasileiro Série C players
Campeonato Brasileiro Série D players
Primeira Liga players
2. Bundesliga players
Danish Superliga players
Esporte Clube Juventude players
Vitória F.C. players
FSV Frankfurt players
Karlsruher SC players
AaB Fodbold players
Joinville Esporte Clube players
Associação Chapecoense de Futebol players
Centro Sportivo Alagoano players
Brazilian expatriate footballers
Brazilian expatriate sportspeople in Portugal
Brazilian expatriate sportspeople in Germany
Brazilian expatriate sportspeople in Denmark
Expatriate footballers in Portugal
Expatriate footballers in Germany
Expatriate men's footballers in Denmark